{{Speciesbox
|name = Desert bloodwood 
|image = Corymbia opaca habit.jpg
|image_caption = Corymbia opaca in Central Australia
|genus = Corymbia
|species = opaca
|authority = (D.J.Carr & S.G.M.Carr) K.D.Hill & L.A.S.Johnson
|synonyms_ref =
|synonyms =
 Eucalyptus centralis D.J.Carr & S.G.M.Carr 
 Eucalyptus opaca D.J.Carr & S.G.M.Carr
 Eucalyptus orientalis D.J.Carr & S.G.M.Carr 
 Corymbia eremaea subsp. eremaea'  auct. non (D.J.Carr & S.G.M.Carr) K.D.Hill & L.A.S.Johnson
 Eucalyptus terminalis auct. non F.Muell.
 Eucalyptus terminalis auct. non F.Muell.
}}
thumb|225px|fruitCorymbia opaca, also known as the desert bloodwood''', is a species of tree that is endemic to northern Australia. It has rough bark on part or all of the trunk, lance-shaped leaves, club-shaped flower buds and urn-shaped fruit. Several parts of this plant are used by Aboriginal Australians in traditional medicine.

Description
It has rough, tessellated, reddish brown bark over some or all of its trunk.

Taxonomy and naming
The desert bloodwood was first formally described in 1985 by Denis John Carr and Stella Grace Maisie Carr who gave it the name Eucalyptus opaca and published the description in their book Eucalyptus 1 - New or little-known species of the Corymbosae. The type specimens were collected in 1983 from the Lasseter Highway near Kata Tjuta. In 1995, Ken Hill and Lawrie Johnson changed the name to Corymbia opaca, publishing the change in the journal Telopea. The specific epithet (opaca) is derived from the Latin word opacus meaning "darkened, dull, not shining or opaque".

Some authors and herbaria accept C. opaca as a distinct species and others consider it to be inseparable from C. terminalis and C. tumescens. To the extent that the species can be reliably differentiated, C. terminalis has thinner leaves, larger buds and fruit and thicker pedicels than C. opaca.

Distribution and habitatCorymbia opaca'' occurs in scattered population in desert areas of the southwest Kimberley, Pilbara and northern desert regions of Western Australia, in central and southern parts of the Northern Territory (particularly around Alice Springs) and in the Mann and Musgrave Ranges in the far northwest of South Australia. It commonly grows in sandy soils in alluvial areas and on lower hillslopes.

Conservation status
This eucalypt is classified as "not threatened" by the Western Australian Government Department of Parks and Wildlife and as "least concern" in South Australia.

Use in bush medicine
Occasionally a bloodwood tree will shed a piece of bark, hence opening a "wound" through which a blood-like kino will flow. The sap flows until it crystallises, covering up the hole in the bark. Australian Aboriginals collect this substance as bush medicine.  They apply the sticky gum directly to sores or cuts and it works as an antiseptic.  If the sap is in a dried form, it can be crushed into powder and boiled in water to use as an antiseptic wash.

Another use of the bloodwood sap by Aboriginal people is to tan "kangaroo-skin waterbags".

People collect bush coconuts (a type of bush tucker) from the tree, which are produced by an insect in gall.

The roots of the bloodwood tree store water.  Aboriginal peoples would dig up the roots and drain the water into a container.

See also
List of Corymbia species

References

opaca
Myrtales of Australia
Australian Aboriginal bushcraft
Rosids of Western Australia
Flora of the Northern Territory
Flora of South Australia
Plants described in 1985
Taxa named by Maisie Carr